WWE: Uncaged II is a compilation album of unreleased professional wrestling entrance theme songs which was released by WWE on March 21, 2017, on online music stores. The album was originally scheduled to be released on March 17, 2017, but was delayed. The album features multiple tracks that were not available to the general public before the release of the album, track 10 "Danger in the Jungle" with Rainforest intro was originally used for The Headshrinkers, the version that Haku and Faces of Fear used was remixed with drums in WCW.

Track listing
All songs are composed, written and produced by Jim Johnston,

See also

Music in professional wrestling

References

WWE albums
2017 compilation albums